This is a list of mayors of Liestal, Basel-Land, Switzerland. The mayor (Stadtpräsident, earlier: Gemeindepräsident) chairs the five-member city council (Stadtrat) of Liestal.

References 

Liestal
Liestal